The City of Palms Classic is an annual high school basketball tournament held in Fort Myers, Florida.

History
The tournament began in 1973 as a high school boys' basketball tournament with a seven-team format. The earliest editions featured teams primarily from the Fort Myers News-Press' high school coverage area, but there were some quality teams from around the state, including Lakeland High, Brandon, Pompano Beach, Glades Central and Okeechobee.

In 1985, Bill Pollock, a Fort Myers resident whose son, John, was a rising senior at Fort Myers High School, became involved in the tournament, as did the News-Press' preps editor, Donnie Wilkie. The two have teamed ever since, and the tournament, sponsored by Bank of America (formerly Barnett Bank and NationsBank), quickly skyrocketed into a major national event. Pollock's son led Fort Myers to the 1985 tournament championship against a still-mostly-local field. Currently, the tournament consists of a 16-team national bracket, with selected "Sunshine Series" games (featuring additional high school teams from Florida and Georgia) dotting the schedule throughout the typically six-day event.

Among the early breakthroughs for the tournament was a riveting, triple-overtime championship game in 1989, in which Flint Hill School, led by Randolph Childress, Cory Alexander and Serge Zwikker, defeated Abraham Lincoln High School (Brooklyn, New York), led by Norman Marbury and Tchaka Shipp, 70-68, on a last-second 3-pointer by Childress, who went on to stardom at Wake Forest University.

Oak Hill Academy (Mouth of Wilson, Virginia) made its lone appearance (the Florida High School Athletic Association will no longer sanction them to play) in 1991, finishing third after losing to Franklin Learning Center from Philadelphia in the semifinals. Two years later, in 1993, the tournament made history with a field that included Danny Fortson, Ron Mercer, Tim Thomas and future NFL quarterback Daunte Culpepper—all in consolation brackets. Crenshaw High School (Los Angeles, California) won that year's tournament, scoring 117, 99 and 98 points in three of its four games, and finished the season ranked No. 3 in the nation by USA Today. St. Augustine High School (New Orleans, Louisiana) won the following year and went on to capture USA Today's mythical national championship in boys' basketball. The success in the early and mid 1990s catapulted the tournament into national prominence.

The tournament has remained a highlight on the national schedule ever since, drawing the interest of major-college coaches and recruiting analysts alike. By 2015, 120 McDonald's All-Americans have played in this pre-Christmas event, and as of 2015, 94 players had been selected in the NBA draft.

Montverde Academy became the first school to win consecutive City of Palms Classic titles since the tournament expanded beyond local teams in 2013, defeating Paul VI High School. Montverde's two championship wins were led by stars Dakari Johnson (2012), D'Angelo Russell (2012/13), and Ben Simmons (2013). Montverde also played in the 2014 championship game, but was denied a three-peat by Wheeler High School and star player Jaylen Brown. The final tournament played at Bishop Verot was won by Chino Hills High School, who defeated The Patrick School from Elizabeth, New Jersey. The Patrick School was coached by Mike Rice, on the sidelines for the first time since being fired as the Rutgers coach.

In 2020, the tournament was canceled due to the COVID-19 pandemic. It was the first time in the 48-year history that the tournament was canceled. The tournament resumed the following year, in 2021.

Locations
The event has had five hosts in its 43-year history, including Edison Community College (Fort Myers, Florida) from 1973–83 and twice more in 1990 and '93, Cape Coral High School (Cape Coral, Florida) in 1984, Fort Myers High School (Fort Myers, Florida) from 1985–89 and the Harborside Convention Hall in downtown Fort Myers in 1991 and '92. The tournament found a long-term home when a new, 2,300-seat gymnasium was built at Bishop Verot High School (Fort Myers, Florida), where it was played from 1994 to 2015. In 2016, the tournament moves to Suncoast Credit Union Arena, a 3,300-seat facility on the campus of Florida SouthWestern State College.

Past winners
 2021: Montverde Academy (Montverde, Florida)
2017: University School (Fort Lauderdale,  Florida)
 2016: Montverde Academy (Montverde, Florida)
 2015: Chino Hills High School (Chino Hills, California)
 2014: Wheeler High School (Marietta, Georgia)
 2013: Montverde Academy (Montverde, Florida)
 2012: Montverde Academy (Montverde, Florida)
 2011: Prestonwood Christian Academy (Plano, Texas)
 2010: St. Patrick High School Academy (Elizabeth, New Jersey)
 2009: Paterson Catholic High School (Paterson, New Jersey)
 2008: Mater Dei High School (Santa Ana, California)
 2007: St. Benedict's Preparatory School (Newark, New Jersey)
 2006: Mater Dei High School (Santa Ana, California)
 2005: Brentwood Academy (Brentwood, Tennessee)
 2004: Niagara Falls High School (Niagara Falls, New York)
 2003: Westchester High School (Los Angeles, California)
 2002: Rice High School (Manhattan, New York)
 2001: Westchester High School (Los Angeles, California)
 2000: Westchester High School (Los Angeles, California)
 1999: Ballard High School (Louisville, Kentucky)
 1998: Scott County High School (Georgetown, Kentucky)
 1997: Parkview Baptist High School (Baton Rouge, Louisiana)
 1996: Miami Senior High School (Miami, Florida), Classic I; 
 Lexington Catholic High School (Lexington, Kentucky), Classic II
 1995: Dominguez High School (Compton, California)
 1994: St. Augustine High School (New Orleans, Louisiana)
 1993: Crenshaw High School (Los Angeles, California)
 1992: Dunbar High School (Washington, D.C.)
 1991: Miami Senior High School (Miami, Florida)
 1990: Gibbs High School (St. Petersburg, Florida)
 1989: Flint Hill School (Oakton, Virginia)
 1988: Carol City High School (Miami, Florida)
 1987: Jackson High School (Miami, Florida)
 1986: Forrest High School (Jacksonville, Florida)
 1985: Fort Myers High School (Fort Myers, Florida)
 1984: Cypress Lake High School (Fort Myers, Florida)

References

High school sports in Florida
Basketball competitions in Florida
High school basketball competitions in the United States
Sports in Fort Myers, Florida
1973 establishments in Florida
Recurring sporting events established in 1973